95th/Dan Ryan, announced as 95th, is an 'L' station in the median of the Dan Ryan Expressway and serving Chicago's Roseland neighborhood. Currently, it serves as the southern terminus of the Chicago Transit Authority's Red Line, and is the southernmost CTA station. This station was the system's thirteenth busiest in 2021. Trains take approximately 30 minutes to travel to the Loop, and 60 minutes to reach .

Like Howard, this station has a bus terminal and connects to CTA and Pace buses, but unlike Howard, it also connects to Greyhound buses.

History
The station opened on September 28, 1969 as part of the Dan Ryan branch, in the mid-1990s, the station's name was changed from 95th to 95/Dan Ryan, then later to 95th/Dan Ryan.

Ridership
Over 1 million people used the terminal in 2021. Many commuters from the far south side or south suburbs connect to 95th Street via the CTA and Pace bus systems. 95th/Dan Ryan is the southernmost stop in the CTA system. 

The station also serves as the Greyhound bus "Chicago 95th & Dan Ryan, Illinois" station.

95th/Dan Ryan Terminal Improvement Project

After the Red Line South Reconstruction project was completed in October 2013, The CTA did an improvement project that costed $280 million, and expanded, improved and rebuilt the entire 95th/Dan Ryan terminal; the station remained open during the project, the project began on September 22, 2014. The entire project was completed on April 27, 2019, with the reopening of the Red Line train platform under the South Terminal building, which became a walkway, the new and expanded terminal has a pedestrian bridge that connects the North and South Terminal buildings, four customer assistant booths, two on the outside of the station, one in the North Terminal and one in the South Terminal, six station entrances, four at the North Terminal and two at the South Terminal, additional escalators, elevators and stairs, additional turnstiles and Ventra card machines, additional bike racks, security cameras, and more bus boarding areas than the old station.

Extension

On January 26, 2018, the final alignment for the extension was announced. The extension would run west of the existing Union Pacific Railroad tracks from I-57 to 107th Place, then cross over the Union Pacific Railroad tracks and run east of the tracks until crossing the Metra Electric tracks near 119th Street, and continuing at-grade to 130th Street, three new stations would be built at 103rd, 111th, and Michigan, a new yard and shop would be built at 120th Street, and a new terminal station would be built at 130th. if the CTA can get the funding for the $3.6 billion extension, construction on the extension would begin in 2025 and would be completed in 2029.

Bus connections
CTA
 3 King Drive
 4 Cottage Grove
 X4 Cottage Grove Express (Weekday Rush Hours only)
 N5 South Shore Night Bus (Owl Service - Overnight only)
 N9 Ashland (Owl Service - Overnight only)
 29 State
 34 South Michigan (Owl Service)
 95 95th
 100 Jeffery Manor Express (Weekday Rush Hours only)
 103 West 103rd
 106 East 103rd
 108 Halsted/95th (Weekdays only)
 111 111th/King Drive
 112 Vincennes/111th
 115 Pullman/115th
 119 Michigan/119th

Pace
 352 Halsted (24/7 Service)
 353 95th/Dan Ryan CTA/Calumet City/Homewood
 359 Robbins/South Kedzie Avenue
 381 95th Street
 395 95th/Dan Ryan CTA/UPS Hodgkins (Weekday UPS shifts only)
 772 Brookfield Zoo Express/CTA Red Line (Memorial Day through Labor Day on weekends only)

Notes and references

Notes

References

External links
 95th/Dan Ryan Station Page at Chicago-'L'.org
 Train schedule (PDF) at CTA official site
 95th/Dan Ryan Station Page CTA official site
 Greyhound Chicago 95th & Dan Ryan Station
 State Street entrance from Google Maps Street View
 Lafayette Avenue entrance from Google Maps Street View

CTA Red Line stations
Chicago "L" terminal stations
Railway stations in the United States opened in 1969
Bus stations in Illinois